WAAW (94.7 MHz) is a commercial FM radio station licensed to Williston, South Carolina, and serving the Augusta metropolitan area. The station carries an urban gospel radio format with some Christian talk and teaching programs directed at the African-American community.  It uses the moniker "Shout 94.7" and its slogan is "The station for inspiration and empowerment information."  It is owned by Wisdom, Inc., led by Dr. Frank Neely.  The radio studios and offices are on Park Avenue SE in Aiken, South Carolina.

WAAW has an effective radiated power (ERP) of 2,550 watts.  The transmitter is on Perry Street at Old Barnwell Road in Montmorenci, South Carolina.

History
WAAW signed on the air in late 1995 with a Classic R&B format as "94.7 The Boss." It was owned by legendary soul music singer James Brown under his company Brown Family Broadcasting.

Brown sold the station in 2002 and the format was changed to Urban Gospel.

References

External links

Radio stations established in 1996
Gospel radio stations in the United States
AAW